"Drank & Drugs" (English translation: "Drinks and drugs") is a song by Dutch rappers Lil' Kleine and Ronnie Flex. It was featured on the 2015 album  by the  under the Dutch hip-hop label TopNotch and subsequently released as a single reaching number one in the Netherlands and number three in Dutch-speaking Belgium. It was featured in the sixth episode of the third series of the BBC 2 comedy Motherland.

Charts

German version 
There is also a German-language version, titled "Stoff und Schnaps". Released in 2016, it reached number 16 in Germany and number 65 in Austria.

Certifications

References 

2015 songs
2015 singles
Hip hop songs
Dutch pop songs
Dutch-language songs